Megacephala morsii is a species of tiger beetle in the subfamily Cicindelinae that was described by Fairmaire in 1882.

References

morsii
Beetles described in 1882